Toxic oil syndrome 
(TOS) or simply toxic syndrome (Spanish: síndrome del aceite tóxico or síndrome tóxico) is a musculoskeletal disease. A 1981 outbreak in Spain which affected about 20,000 people, with over 300 dying within a few months and a few thousand remaining disabled, is thought to have been caused by contaminated colza (rapeseed) oil.  It was unique because of its size, the novelty of the clinical condition, and the complexity of its aetiology. Its first appearance was as a lung disease, with unusual features, though the symptoms initially resembled a lung infection. The disease appeared to be restricted to certain geographical localities, and several members of a family could be affected, even while their neighbours had no symptoms. Following the acute phase, a range of other chronic symptoms was apparent.

Alternative mechanisms  
The conclusion of the Joint WHO/CISAT Scientific Committee for the Toxic Oil Syndrome from 2002, that oil was the cause for TOS, is based only on epidemiological evidence, since up to now, experimental studies performed in a variety of laboratory animals have failed to reproduce the symptoms of human TOS. None of the in vivo or in vitro studies performed with toxic-oil-specific components, such as fatty acid anilides, and esters of 3-(N-phenylamino)-1,2-propanediol (abbreviated as PAP), have provided evidence that these markers are causally involved in the pathogenesis of TOS.

Specifically, three possible causative agents of TOS are PAP (3-(N-phenylamino)-1,2-propanediol), the 1,2-dioleoyl ester of PAP (abbreviated OOPAP), and the 3-oleoyl ester of PAP (abbreviated OPAP). These three compounds are formed by means of similar chemical processes, and oil that contains one of the three substances is likely to contain the other two. Oil samples that are suspected to have been ingested by people who later developed TOS often contain all three of these contaminants (among other substances), but are most likely to contain OOPAP. However, when these three substances were given to laboratory animals, OOPAP was not acutely toxic, PAP was toxic only after injection, but not after oral administration, and OPAP was toxic only after injection of high doses. Therefore, none of these three substances is thought to cause TOS. Similar results were obtained after administration of fatty acid anilides.

Data discrepancies combined with both a high level of secrecy surrounding the huge investigation and the fact that the first cases of the syndrome were located in Madrid (near the U.S. military base in Torrejón de Ardoz) spread the idea of a conspiracy. Several of those affected by TOS claim they never consumed any of the tainted oil products. Furthermore, the tainted oil was primarily sold in low-cost street markets; yet, a considerable percentage of the patients were wealthy. Another theory suggests the toxic reaction was triggered by organophosphate poisoning (e. g., from pesticide residues in tomatoes) and covered up by the Spanish government and the WHO.

See also 
 Eosinophilia-myalgia syndrome 
 Ginger Jake
 Health crisis
 The Jungle
 List of food contamination incidents

References

External links 
 WHO Report: Toxic Oil Syndrome - Ten years of progress

Connective tissue diseases
Food safety scandals
Adulteration
1981 health disasters
1981 in Spain
Health disasters in Spain
Medical controversies
Mass poisoning
Syndromes